Darrell Gene Hardy (born 1944) is an American retired basketball player.

Hardy played college basketball at Baylor University. He was selected in the third round of the 1967 NBA draft by the Detroit Pistons and in the 1967 ABA draft by the Anaheim Amigos.

Hardy played for the ABA's Houston Mavericks during the 1967–68 season, averaging 5.2 points per game and 3.3 rebounds per game.

References

1944 births
Living people
American men's basketball players
Anaheim Amigos draft picks
Basketball players from Houston
Baylor Bears men's basketball players
Detroit Pistons draft picks
Forwards (basketball)
Houston Mavericks players
Parade High School All-Americans (boys' basketball)